Geoffrey Marshall (22 April 1929 – 24 June 2003) was a leading constitutional theorist in the United Kingdom, best known for his work around the British constitution.

Early life
Marshall was born in Chesterfield on 22 April 1929. His family moved to Blackpool, and Marshall joined Arnold School on a county scholarship. He turned down a place at Balliol College, Oxford, on the grounds that the facilities' heating was not good enough. Instead, in 1947 he joined Manchester University, reading Politics and Economics, and graduated in 1950. He attended lectures by Harold Laski and was asked to prepare them for publication, which he did under the title Reflections on the Constitution.

Career
His first book, Parliamentary Sovereignty and the Commonwealth, was published in 1957. He described "sovereignty" as "an institutional arrangement resting upon an idea, and the idea is one which has philosophical (and even theological) implications". In 1959, his second book, co-authored by Graeme Moodie, was entitled Some Problems of the Constitution and dealt with ministerial responsibility. He examined the controls on government and the means of redress of the citizen against the state. He was elected a fellow and tutor in Politics at Queens's College, Oxford, in 1957, where he stayed until his retirement in 1999.

References

 

 
 
 

1929 births
2003 deaths
English constitutionalists
Alumni of the University of Manchester
Fellows of The Queen's College, Oxford
Provosts of The Queen's College, Oxford
Fellows of Nuffield College, Oxford